The First Whig Junto controlled the government of England from 1694 to 1699 and was the first part of the Whig Junto, a cabal of people who controlled the most important political decisions. The Junto was reappointed twice following the elections of 1695 and 1698.

History
The Whig elite rose to government ascendancy while Lord Danby held office through three shortly-spaced changes of Sovereign (dating to the Royal-dominated ministries of Charles II). The Junto established its dominance in 1694 with the appointment of Sir Charles Montagu as Chancellor of the Exchequer on 10 May. Danby, who had been created Duke of Leeds on 4 May, remained in office, under a diminished role while still Lord President of the Council, but the Junto controlled the government of England from 1694 to 1699.

It was led by six prominent members: Montagu, Somers, Wharton, Romney, Orford, and Shrewsbury. Supporting these peers were two unofficial whips in the House of Lords: the Earls of Sunderland and Portland. Only one of these held at the time an office, albeit less senior, as Lord Chamberlain. The Whig Party held a majority in the House of Commons after the election in 1695, although not all Whig MPs were unswervingly loyal to the Junto.

The Junto oversaw the creation of the Bank of England in 1694, but by 1699 the Junto's power had declined in the face of opposition by Robert Harley and the Tories. Many members of the Junto would return to government from 1706 to 1710 as part of the Godolphin-Marlborough ministry.

Ministry

The government was led by the six most prominent members of the Junto.

Other members of the ministry had less power.

James Vernon was appointed Secretary of State in 1697, with responsibility for the Northern Department. The following year, after the Duke of Shrewsbury left the government, he took responsibility for the Southern Department as well.

Notes

References

English ministries
Political history of England
1690s in England
1694 establishments in England
1699 disestablishments in England
Government
Ministries of William and Mary
1694 in politics